The women's individual recurve archery event at the 2014 Asian Games was held from 23 to 28 September at the Gyeyang Asiad Archery Field in Incheon, South Korea. It was the tenth time the event was held as part of the Asian Games sports programme since the debut of archery in 1978. A total of 56 archers from 18 nations qualified for the event. Yun Ok-hee of South Korea was the defending champion.

The women's individual recurve event was an outdoor recurve target archery event held to the World Archery-approved rules. The competition consisted of three stages spread over one week: an initial ranking round, a four-round single-elimination tournament, and two finals matches, the last of which deciding the winners of the gold, silver, and bronze medals. The ranking round determined the seeds for the subsequent elimination rounds and followed the 1440 format, in which archers each shot a total of 144 arrows at 122 cm-wide targets over four different distances, firing 36 arrows from 70 metres, 60 metres, 50 metres, and 30 metres respectively. The archer scoring highest total from her 144 arrows received the number one seed, the archer with the second highest total receiving second seed, and so on. In the event of a tie between two or more archers, the number of arrows shot in the central 10-ring of the target was taken into account, with the number of arrows shot within the inner-10 (or X) ring used as a second tiebreaker if necessary .A maximum of two archers from each nation were allowed progress to the elimination rounds.

The format of the elimination and medal-deciding rounds followed the Archery Olympic Round set system used in international competitions since 2010. Each match consisted of a maximum of five sets, with archers each shooting three arrows per set at the same 122-cm wide targets from a fixed distance of 70 metres. The archer with the greater score from their three arrows won the set, earning two set points. The archer with the lower score in each set received zero points. If the score was tied, each archer received one point. The first archer to reach six set points was declared the winner. If the match was tied at five set points each after the maximum five sets were played, a single tie-breaker arrow was used with the closest to centre of the target winning.

After securing every gold medal available in the archery competition at the 2006 and 2010 Asian Games, the Korean national team aimed to defend each of their five recurve titles for the second time in succession. Chang Hye-jin, Jung Dasomi, Joo Hyun-jung, and Lee Tuk-young were chosen to compete in the women's events after finishing in the top four positions in the Korean national team selection held earlier in 2014, beating both the reigning Olympic champion Ki Bo-bae and the defending Asian Games champion Yun Ok-hee to represent their nation.

The semi-finals commenced on the afternoon of 28 September following the conclusion of the team recurve events, in which Chang, Jung, and Lee emerged victorious over the Chinese trio of Cheng, Xu, and Zhu to take the gold medal.

The medal matches took place after the semi-finals. As the two losing archers from the semi-finals, Xu faced Hayakawa in the bronze medal match. Xu emerged the winner, posting three successive set victories to come from two set points down to defeat the Japanese archer. The all-Korean gold medal match followed afterwards and saw Jung comprehensively defeat Chang with a consistency that Chang struggled to match. Although Chang was able to tie the second set, Jung missed the central 10 ring just twice in her twelve shots, earning a standing ovation from the home crowd with a perfect score of 30 in the fourth and final set to claim her second Asian Games gold medal of the day.

Schedule
All times are Korea Standard Time (UTC+09:00)

Results

Ranking round

Knockout round

Bracket

Finals

Top half

Bottom half

1/16 eliminations

1/8 eliminations

Quarterfinals

Semifinals

Bronze medal match

Gold medal match

References

External links
Official website of the 2014 Asian Games

Women's recurve individual